Saint Bruno or Saint-Bruno may refer to:

Roman Catholic saints
Bruno of Cologne (c. 1030–1101), German founder of the Carthusian Order
Bruno the Great (925–965), German Archbishop of Cologne and Duke of Lotharingia
Bruno of Querfurt (c. 974–1009), German missionary bishop and martyr
Bruno (Bishop of Segni) (c. 1047–1123), Italian Bishop of Segni and Abbot of Montecassino
Bruno, Duke of Saxony (c. 880) one of the Martyrs of Ebsdorf
Bruno (Bishop of Würzburg) (c. 1005–1045), Imperial Chancellor of Italy and later Prince-Bishop of Würzburg

Places:
Saint-Bruno, Quebec, Canada, a municipality
Mont Saint-Bruno, Quebec, a mountain
Saint-Bruno (AMT), a railway station in Saint-Bruno-de-Montarville, Quebec

See also
Carthusian Order or Order of Saint Bruno, a Roman Catholic religious order
Saint-Bruno-de-Guigues, Quebec, a municipality 
Saint-Bruno-de-Kamouraska, Quebec, a municipality
Saint-Bruno-de-Montarville, Quebec, a suburb of Montreal
San Bruno (disambiguation)